T. C. Balaji, better known by his stage name Daniel Balaji, is an Indian actor and writer, who predominantly appears in Tamil and Malayalam films.

Early life and career
Balaji studied a film direction course in Taramani film institute, Chennai. His uncle is Kannada film director Siddalingaiah, the father of Tamil actor Murali. His nephew is Atharvaa, who made his acting debut in Baana Kaathadi.

Balaji began his film career as a unit production manager on the sets of Kamal Haasan's unreleased Marudhanayagam. Balaji's first role was in the television serial Chithi, where he played a character named Daniel. After the success of the show, in his second serial Alaigal, director Sunder K. Vijayan, named him as Daniel Balaji thinking that he portrayed his own character in Chithi.

His first film in Tamil was April Maadhathil, followed by a role in Kaadhal Kondein. His first major role was in Kaakha Kaakha as a police officer alongside Suriya, who played the leading role. The film, directed by Gautham Vasudev Menon, was about a squad of policemen fighting organized crime in Chennai. Balaji followed this up with another major role in Menon's next film, that of the antagonist Amudhan in the blockbuster film Vettaiyaadu Vilaiyaadu. The film starred Kamal Haasan and was a police procedural focusing on a series of murders. Balaji's portrayal of both these roles received praise.

His next film, Polladhavan, was also successful. He also acted as one of the villains in the Telugu film Chirutha and followed this up by playing the hero in Muthirai, produced by Vision Jeeva Studios.

Balaji made his debut in Malayalam cinema through Black. Later, he was cast the villain in Bhagavan (opposite Mohanlal) and Daddy Cool (opposite Mammootty).

Filmography

References

External links
 

Living people
Male actors in Tamil cinema
1975 births
Male actors from Chennai